Jonathan Dennis (27 September 1953 – 25 January 2002) was a New Zealand film archivist, broadcaster and writer. He was a founder of the New Zealand Film Archive and its director from 1981 to 1990.

References

External links
 

1953 births
2002 deaths
Film archivists